Yulian Petkov (born 20 June 1979) is a retired Bulgarian footballer who last played as a midfielder for Lokomotiv 1929 Sofia.

Petkov previously played for Levski Sofia, Spartak Pleven, Lokomotiv Sofia, Kaliakra Kavarna and Akademik Sofia.

References

External links
 

1979 births
Living people
Bulgarian footballers
First Professional Football League (Bulgaria) players
Second Professional Football League (Bulgaria) players
PFC Levski Sofia players
PFC Spartak Pleven players
FC Lokomotiv 1929 Sofia players
PFC Kaliakra Kavarna players
Akademik Sofia players
PFC Lokomotiv Mezdra players
Association football midfielders